The Women's 3 × 2.5 km Relay competition of the Vancouver 2010 Paralympics was held at Whistler Olympic Park in Whistler, British Columbia. The competition was held Thursday, March 18.

Each team used three skiers with a disability. The relay was an open class event, open for standing, visually impaired and sitting classifications. An athlete with a visual impairment has a sighted guide (class B1, B2, optional for B3). Guides are an integral part of cross-country skiing for athletes with a visual impairment, and are medal contenders.

Results

See also
Cross-country skiing at the 2010 Winter Olympics – Women's 4 × 5 kilometre relay

References

External links
2010 Winter Paralympics schedule and results , at the official website of the 2010 Winter Paralympics in Vancouver

Women's 3 x 2.5 km Relay
Para